Aero is a Greek prefix relating to flight and air. In British English, it is used as an adjective related to flight (e.g., as a shortened substitute for aeroplane).

Aero, Ærø, or Aeros may refer to:

Aeronautics

Airlines and companies
 Aero (Polish airline), a Polish airline founded in 1925 which later was merged into LOT
 Aero Airlines, an Estonian airline owned by Finnair
 Aero Commander, formerly known as Aero, a division of Rockwell International
 Aero Cóndor, an airline based in Lima, Peru
 Aero Contractors (Nigeria), a scheduled airline from Nigeria
 Aero Contractors (United States), private charter company based in Smithfield, North Carolina
 Aero O/Y, former name of Finnair
 Aero Vodochody, a Czech aircraft manufacturer founded in 1919
 Aerocondor, Portuguese airline
 Aeroflot, the flag carrier of the Russian Federation
 Aerolíneas Argentinas, the flag carrier airline of Argentina
 Aeroméxico, the flag carrier airline of Mexico
 Aeroperú, a Peruvian airline
 Aeropostal Alas de Venezuela, an airline based in Caracas in Venezuela
 Aéropostale (aviation), a French aviation company
 Gulfstream Aerospace, an American subsidiary of General Dynamics

Equipment
 Aero engine or aircraft engine
 AeroMobil, a Slovak prototype roadable aircraft
 Aeroplane, an alternate spelling of airplane

Other aeronautics 
 AERO Friedrichshafen, an annual German airshow
 Aerodynamics
 Aerospace engineering

Arts, entertainment, and media

Music
Aero (rapper), French rapper part of the French hip hop duo PSO Thug
 AERO, a 2004 album by Jean-Michel Jarre
 Aero - Tribute to the Wind, a 2002 concert by Jean Michel Jarre at Aalborg, Denmar
 "Aerodynamic" (instrumental), by Daft Punk
 Aerosmith, an American rock band

Other uses in arts, entertainment, and media
 Aerobiz, a video game
 Aero (Marvel Comics), a character in the Marvel Universe
 Aero (manhua), a Chinese manhua comic series about the Marvel character of the same name
 Aero the Acro-Bat, a game by Iguana Entertainment
 Aero the Acro-Bat 2, a game sequel again starring Aero
 Melody Guthrie, also known as Aero, a character in the Marvel Universe
 An aerodactyl in the manga/comic Pokémon Adventures
 A character in the manga/comic 12 Beast

Computing and technology
 .aero, an Internet top-level domain
 Aerohive Networks, an American multinational computer networking equipment company
 Compaq Aero, a PDA (Personal Digital Assistant)
 Dell Aero, the first smartphone from Dell
 Nokia Aero, concept-phone by Nokia
 Windows Aero, a user interface in Windows Vista and Windows 7

Food
 Aero (chocolate bar), a chocolate bar created by Rowntrees and now made by Nestlé
 Aero Biscuits, a biscuit bar made by Nestlé, based on their chocolate bar

Motor vehicles

Automobiles and motorcycles
 Aero (automobile), a Czechoslovak automobile
 Aero (motorcycle), a 1920s Japanese bike built by Narazo Shamazu
 Aero Minor, a Czechoslovak automobile
 Aeros, high-performance versions of cars from Saab Automobile
 SSC Aero, a mid-engine sports car by Shelby Super Cars

Buses and monorails
 Aerobus, a form of transport which uses a non-typical monorail system on a cable system, similar to the one used by suspension bridges
 Hyundai Aero, a bus built by the Hyundai Motor Company
 Mitsubishi Fuso Aero Bus series

Other uses
 Ærø, Danish island  
 Aero (color), a shade of Air Force blue
 Akron Aeros, former name of Akron RubberDucks, a Minor League Baseball team in Akron, Ohio, U.S.

See also
 Aereo, TV service, now defunct
 Aéropostale (clothing), a US clothing store